JS++ is a proprietary programming language for web development that extends JavaScript with a sound type system. It includes imperative, object-oriented, functional, and generic programming features.

History 
JS++ first appeared on October 8, 2011. The modern implementation was announced at DeveloperWeek 2016 and released on May 31, 2016. The language is designed by Roger Poon and Anton Rapetov.

Syntax

Type annotations 

Since JS++ is a superset of JavaScript, declaring types for variables is optional.

int x = 1; // declares the variable x with an "internal type" (JS++ type)
var y = 2; // declares the variable y with an "external type" (JavaScript type)
bool z = true; // declares the variable z with an "internal type" (JS++ type)

Features 

JS++ features a type system that is sound.

JS++ is able to efficiently analyze out-of-bounds errors at compile time.

Development tools

Compiler 

The JS++ compiler is available for Windows, Mac OS X, and Linux. The compiler generates JavaScript output.

Editor integration 

JS++ integrates with various code editors including Visual Studio Code, Atom, and Sublime Text.

Build tools 

JS++ can be integrated with third-party build tools like Webpack.

Release history

See also 
 TypeScript
 PureScript

References 

Programming languages
Web programming
Class-based programming languages
Functional languages
Statically typed programming languages
High-level programming languages
Programming languages created in 2011